Centrodraco is a genus of slope dragonets found in deep waters of the Atlantic, Indian & Pacific Oceans.

Species
There are currently 14 recognized species in this genus:
 Centrodraco abstractum R. Fricke,  2002 (Abstract slope dragonet)
 Centrodraco acanthopoma (Regan, 1904) (North Atlantic slope dragonet)
 Centrodraco atrifilum R. Fricke, 2010 
 Centrodraco fidelis R. Fricke, 2015 
 Centrodraco gegonipus (Parin, 1982) (Sala y Gómez slope dragonet)
 Centrodraco insolitus (McKay, 1971) (Western Australian slope dragonet)
 Centrodraco lineatus R. Fricke, 1992
 Centrodraco nakaboi R. Fricke, 1992 (Nakabo's slope dragonet)
 Centrodraco oregonus (Briggs & F. H. Berry, 1959) (Brazilian slope dragonet)
 Centrodraco ornatus (Fourmanoir & Rivaton, 1979) (Ornate slope dragonet)
 Centrodraco otohime Nakabo & Yamamoto, 1980
 Centrodraco pseudoxenicus (Kamohara, 1952) (Japanese slope dragonet) 
 Centrodraco rubellus R. Fricke, Chave & Suzumoto, 1992
 Centrodraco striatus (Parin, 1982) (Striped slope dragonet)

References

Draconettidae
Taxa named by Charles Tate Regan